Mesogobio lachneri is a species of freshwater fish in the family Cyprinidae. It is endemic to the Yalujiang River in Asia.

Etymology
Named in honor of Ernest A. Lachner (1916-1996), curator of fishes at the U.S. National Museum, for facilitating the senior author’s visits to several museums in the United States.

References

 

Mesogobio
Fish described in 1973
Taxa named by Petre Mihai Bănărescu
Taxa named by Teodor T. Nalbant